St. Bernard Urban Rapid Transit (SBURT) is the operator of public transportation in St. Bernard Parish, Louisiana, a suburban portion of New Orleans. The agency services 45,000 people, with over 92,000 annual unlinked trips in 2017. Although SBURT is in geographic proximity to the New Orleans Regional Transit Authority, it operates independently, with a separate and non-transferable fare structure.

Route Information 
St. Bernard Urban Rapid Transit operates one line between Arabi and Poydras, Louisiana, Monday through Friday, every 40 minutes from 5:55 a.m. to 7:50 p.m., for $1. SBURT offers pre-arranged and on demand route alterations to St. Bernard Hospital, Trist Middle School, J. F. Gauthier School, St. Bernard State Park, and Fanz Trailer Park, as well as route deviations for ADA eligible passengers.

References

External links
St. Bernard Urban Rapid Transit

Bus transportation in Louisiana
Transit agencies in Louisiana
Transportation in New Orleans